Whispers of Dead Zone is a 2012 drama in Turkish-French co-production, directed by Fırat Çağrı Beyaz. The film premiered at the Istanbul International Film Festival.

Synopsis 
Mete (Mete Pere) is a successful young television director from Northern Cyprus that has settled down in Istanbul, yet doesn't quite feel like he belongs there. He returns to his homeland of Cyprus with the intent to make a documentary. While on the island, Mete feels the division between the Greek and Turkish cultures that exist within him, especially while visiting the graves of his ex-girlfriend, mother, and old friends. He also slowly begins to build a relationship with Rüyam (Leman Özdogan ), a beautiful woman that he meets on the island while taking photographs. Their meeting forces him to choose between leaving the island and his homeland or looking beyond his problems with where he belongs and the disintegration of his being.

Cast 
Mete Pere as Mete
Leman Özdogan as Rüyam
Sevcan Çerkez as Nurdan
Toprak Altay
Cenk Gürcağ
Haluk Ramon Serhun
Sahir Cacci
Başak Ekenoğlu
Kıvanç Giritli
Şerife Akman
Emre Yazgın

Development
Beyaz stated that he chose the film's name because he symbolically viewed Cyprus as "a dead country, a dead piece of land". The development of the screenplay took him a year, while partial sponsorship for shooting came from the city of Girne and Karpaz district. After completion the film was backed by the Ministry of Culture and Tourism, helping its promotion in international festivals.

Filming began in March 2011 in the Kyrenia and Karpaz districts, and was Beyaz's directing debut.

The film has already been sold for television broadcast and online streaming.

Festivals 
Ölü Bölgeden Fısıltılar has been picked as an official selection at the following film festivals:

 2012 International Istanbul Film Festival
 2012 Izmir International Film Festival
 2012 Sinemardin Mardin International Film Festival
 2012 Amed International Film Festival

References

External links 
 
 Official film website
 Paradoks Film English-French
 Paradoks Film ParadoksDergi - Turkish

2012 films
2012 drama films
Turkish drama films
2010s Turkish-language films
Films set in Cyprus